The men's 73 kg judo event at the 2019 European Games in Minsk was held on 23 June at the Čyžoŭka-Arena.

Results

Finals

Repechage

Pool A

Pool B

Pool C

Pool D

References

External links
 
 Draw Sheet

M73
2019